Mulieris may refer to :

Adam Pulchrae Mulieris, a Paris master who studied under Peter of Lamballe and flourished in the first half of the 13th century.
Mulieris Towers, twin towers located in the Puerto Madero neighborhood of Buenos Aires, Argentina.
Mulieris Dignitatem, a 1988 apostolic letter by John Paul II on the dignity of women.